The American Journal of Orthopsychiatry is a bimonthly peer-reviewed medical journal covering orthopsychiatry. It is published by the American Psychological Association on behalf of the Global Alliance for Behavioral Health and Social Justice and the editors-in-chief are Jill D. McLeigh (University of Colorado School of Medicine) and William Spaulding (University of Nebraska - Lincoln).

Abstracting and indexing 
The journal is abstracted and indexed in: 

According to the Journal Citation Reports, the journal has a 2020 impact factor of 2.364.

References

External links 
 
 American Orthopsychiatric Association

Psychiatry journals
American Psychological Association academic journals
Quarterly journals
English-language journals
Publications established in 1930
Psychotherapy journals